Jack Colwell is an Australian singer-songwriter.

Early life 
Colwell's mother was a concert pianist. He attended the Sydney Conservatorium of Music High School.

Prior to launching his solo career, Colwell worked behind the scenes in the Australian music industry, assisting Karen O with her performance of "Stop The Virgens" at the Sydney Opera House in 2012 and arranging vocals for Architecture in Helsinki. He also had a band called Jack Colwell & The Owls.

Career 
Colwell attracted attention in August 2015 when Rolling Stone Australia premiered the video for his single "Don't Cry Those Tears".

The song topped AMRAP’s Metro radio chart for four consecutive weeks but programmers at Triple J told Colwell, who was 25 years old at the time, that "Don't Cry Those Tears" sounded 'too old' to be played on the station. 

In late August 2015, he self-released his first solo EP, Only When Flooded Could I Let Go.

In September 2015, Colwell appeared at Newtown Social Club as part of Rolling Stone's "Live Lodge" concert series. In November 2015, ARIA-winning singer-songwriter Sarah Blasko announced that Colwell would be the main support act on her 2016 Australian tour.

In August 2016, Colwell released When The World Explodes, an EP featuring remixes of songs from Only When Flooded... by HEALTH, Fennesz, Roly Porter, Ash Koosha, Rabit and Marcus Whale.

In October 2016, Colwell played a sold-out hometown show at the Sydney Opera House with a string ensemble.

Swandream 
Colwell self-released his debut album, Swandream, in 2020.

Produced by Sarah Blasko, Swandream was acclaimed by critics: NME declared it "an utterly visceral listen with immediate impact" while The Guardian said "Colwell and Blasko have built a full-immersion tale that is both theatrical and real."

BrooklynVegan called Swandream "a record loaded with lush, moody ballads and soaring anthems" and Junkee crowned it "the fieriest and most beautiful album of the year so far."

Swandream ranked #5 on NME's '25 Best Australian Albums of 2020' list.

Prior to the album's release, Colwell shared a collaboration with Owen Pallett, "I Will Not Change My Ways". The song, written by Colwell and arranged by Pallett, was recorded in one take while Colwell was in Pallett’s native Toronto. An alternative version appeared on Swandream.

A track from the album, "In My Dreams", was remixed by Robin Guthrie of the Cocteau Twins. Guthrie's version appeared alongside remixes by Joel Amey of Wolf Alice and Australian musicians Rainbow Chan and Marcus Whale on the EP Swanlux.

Advocacy 
In November 2016, Colwell released the song No Mercy in honour of deceased Australian teenager Tyrone Unsworth.

In September 2017, Colwell programmed and performed at Unity: the Equality Campaign concert at the Enmore Theatre in Sydney with Sarah Blasko, Killing Heidi, The Jezabels and others. Proceeds from the event went to Australian Marriage Equality, a registered charity advocating for the legalisation of same-sex marriage in Australia.

Personal life
He was born three months premature.

Colwell is a noted Tori Amos fan. In 2015, Kill Your Darlings published Colwell's essay Ears with Feet: Life Among the Tori Amos Super Fans. In 2017, Colwell told Double J: "What I love about Tori is that she made the piano cool."

References

Australian indie rock musicians
Living people
Year of birth missing (living people)
Australian singer-songwriters
21st-century Australian singers
21st-century Australian male singers
Australian male singer-songwriters